Buffalo Hart Township may refer to:

 Buffalo Hart Township, Sangamon County, Illinois
 Buffalo Hart Township, McDonald County, Missouri, in McDonald County, Missouri

Township name disambiguation pages